Anton Kuh (12 July 1890 in Vienna – 18 January 1941 in New York City) was an Austrian-Jewish journalist and essayist.

Works
 Juden und Deutsche, Erich Reiss, Berlin 1921

Selected filmography
 Never Trust a Woman (1930)
 The Land of Smiles (1930)

External links 
 

Austrian male writers
Jewish Austrian writers
Jewish emigrants from Austria to the United States after the Anschluss
Writers from Vienna
1890 births
1941 deaths